Jerdy Schouten (born 12 January 1997) is a Dutch professional footballer who plays as a midfielder for Serie A club Bologna and the Netherlands national team.

Club career

Schouten made his professional debut in the Eredivisie for ADO Den Haag on 10 December 2016 in a game against N.E.C.

In 2018, Schouten signed for Eredivisie side SBV Excelsior, where he signed a contract until 2021. For his performances in the 2018-19 Eredivisie season, Schouten was voted by the fans as the club's player of the year.

On 4 July 2019, he signed for Italian football club Bologna.

International career 
Schouten was first called up to the Dutch national team on 27 May 2022 for the Nations League matches against Belgium, Wales and Poland. He made his senior debut in the game against Wales.

Career statistics

References

External links
 
 

1997 births
Living people
People from Hellevoetsluis
People from Spijkenisse
Footballers from South Holland
Association football midfielders
Dutch footballers
Netherlands international footballers
ADO Den Haag players
SC Telstar players
Excelsior Rotterdam players
Bologna F.C. 1909 players
Eredivisie players
Eerste Divisie players
Serie A players
Dutch expatriate footballers
Expatriate footballers in Italy
Dutch expatriate sportspeople in Italy